Huseyn Javid,was born Huseyn Abdulla oglu Rasizadeh (24 October 1882, Nakhchivan – 5 December 1941, Shevchenko, Tayshetsky District), was a prominent Azerbaijani poet and playwright of the early 20th century. He was one of the founders of progressive romanticism movement in the contemporary Azerbaijani literature. He was exiled during the Stalin purges in the USSR.

Life and career 
Huseyn Abdulla oglu Rasizadeh was born in 1882 to a family of a theologian in Nakhchivan in the Erivan Governorate. After completing his elementary education at a religious school in 1898, Javid pursued his mid-school education in the Maktab-i Tarbiya of Mashadi Taghi Sidgi. In 1899–1903, Huseyn Javid studied in the Talibiyya Madrasah in Tabriz. After obtaining a degree in literature at the Istanbul University in 1909, Javid worked as a teacher in Nakhchivan, Ganja and Tiflis, and starting from 1915 in Baku.

Huseyn Javid's first book of lyrical poems titled Kechmish gunlar ("The Past Days") was published in 1913. However Javid was known more as a playwright. His philosophical and epic tragedies, and family dramas introduce a new line of development in Azerbaijani literature. In his literary tragedy Sheikh Sanan (1914), Huseyn Javid philosophized about the idea of a universal religion to lift inter-religious barrier between humans. His most famous creation, Iblis (The Devil) written in 1918, exposed all oppressive forces as the supporters of "humans are wolves to each other" philosophy and "the 20th century cultural savages", and summarized them in the character of Satan. In his works, Javid criticized any form of colonialism and oppression.

During the 1920s and 1930s, Huseyn Javid authored a number of historical epics, such as Peyghambar (The Prophet) in 1922, Topal Teymur (Timur) in 1925, Sayavush (Siyâvash) in 1933 and Khayyam (Khayyám) in 1935.

Arrest, exile and death 
Huseyn Javid wrote during the time of Collectivization and Stalin purges in the Soviet Azerbaijan. In the worst times of totalitarianism, he refused to serve as propagandist of "revolutionary socialist achievements". Javid was arrested in 1937 on trumped-up charges of being a "founding member of a counter-revolutionary group that was plotting an overthrow of the Soviet power".

His arrest was a part of the nationwide campaign of purge against intelligentsia. The Soviet government exiled Huseyn Javid to the Far East to the city of Magadan, Siberia in the late 1930s. He died on 5 December 1941 in the village of Shevchenko (Tayshetsky District). Huseyn Javid was officially exonerated in 1956. His repatriation came only on Javid's 100th birthday in 1982, when his remains were moved from Shevchenko back to his homeland of Nakhchivan and reburied in a mausoleum built in Javid's honor. Monument to Javid was built in King's Park in Podgorica in 2013.

One of the primary work of Huseyn Javid is his “Iblis (The Evil)” tragedy written in 1918. The author concludes all his observations during the processes was happening in the beginning of the 20th century. Javid creates his main character “evil”. In this work of tragedy the author touches several pressing issues which concerned him, such as wars and their tragic consequences, the causes of wars (including human ego) and his philosophical views regarding the future destiny of the world.

List of works

Works of Huseyn Javid up to 1920Huseyn Javid's Work II volume (2006)

Works of Huseyn Javid during Soviet period

Family members 
Mushkunaz Javid (wife) was born in 1902 in Nakhchivan. She died in 1976. His son was Artogrul Javid (1919) was born in Baku. He studied at Azerbaijan Pedagogical University (1940). In 1941–1942, he studied at Azerbaijan Conservatorium. Uzeyir Hajibeyov was his teacher. Artogrul devoted his first work – “9 Lariasiya” to his teacher. He died in 1943. Artogrul's grave is situated next to his parents in Nakhchivan.

Memorial museum of Huseyn Javid 

In 1981, Azerbaijan Communist Party decided the establishment of memorial museums of Huseyn Javid in Baku and Nakhchivan for the “100 years anniversary of Huseyn Javid”. This initiation was realized in 1995 by the order of Heydar Aliyev. The area of the home museum in Baku is 245 m2. In exposition of the home museum of Huseyn Javid, there are more than 600 exhibits which includes his and his family's personal belonging, his publications and works, photos etc.

Home museum of Huseyn Javid was opened in 1984 in Alixan street where Javid was born. There are about 6000 exhibits. Besides preserving personal belongings and writings of Huseyn Javid, the museum researches his works.

Huseyn Javid Mausoleum 
The mausoleum was built in 1996, for the 114th anniversary of Huseyn Javid. It was built on his grave. The architect of the mausoleum is honored architect Rasim Aliyev. Heydar Aliyev participated in the opening ceremony of the mausoleum.

See also
House-Museum and Memorial Complex of Huseyn Javid
ANAS House-Museum of Huseyn Javid

References

External links 

 "Husein Javid: The Night Father Was Arrested," by his daughter Turan, Azerbaijan International, Vol. 4:1 ( Spring 1996), pp. 24, 26.

1882 births
1941 deaths
Azerbaijani dramatists and playwrights
Azerbaijani male poets
People from Nakhchivan
Prisoners who died in Soviet detention
Azerbaijani people who died in prison custody
20th-century Azerbaijani poets
20th-century Azerbaijani dramatists and playwrights
20th-century male writers
Azerbaijani Bahá'ís